Vidyananda was an 8th-century Indian Jain monk.

Life
Vidyananda was a Digambara Jain logician, scholar and monk in Pataliputra. He was born in 750 AD and died in 800. Madhvacharya, a Hindu philosopher has mentioned about Vidyananda.

Works
He wrote Ashtasahasri which is a commentary on Samantabhadra's Devagamastotra.

Legacy
Another digambara acharya with the same name flourished in the 20th-century India.

References

Citations

Sources
 
 

Indian Jain monks
8th-century Indian Jains
8th-century Jain monks
8th-century Indian monks
750 births
800 deaths